Safadasht (also Romanized as Şafādasht) is a city in Safadasht District of Malard County, Tehran province, Iran. At the 2006 census, its population was 15,855 in 4,056 households. The following census in 2011 counted 19,233 people in 5,344 households. The latest census in 2016 showed a population of 32,476 people in 9,687 households.

References 

Malard County

Cities in Tehran Province

Populated places in Tehran Province

Populated places in Malard County